Saidi Juma Makula (born 1 August 1994) is a Tanzanian long distance runner who specialises in the marathon. He competed in the men's marathon event at the 2016 Summer Olympics where he finished in 43rd place with a time of 2:17:49.

References

External links
 

1994 births
Living people
Tanzanian male long-distance runners
Tanzanian male marathon runners
Place of birth missing (living people)
Athletes (track and field) at the 2016 Summer Olympics
Olympic athletes of Tanzania
Athletes (track and field) at the 2018 Commonwealth Games
Commonwealth Games competitors for Tanzania